HC-067047 is a drug which acts as a potent and selective antagonist for the TRPV4 receptor. It has been used to investigate the role of TRPV4 receptors in a number of areas, such as regulation of blood pressure, bladder function and some forms of pain, as well as neurological functions.

See also
 JWH-147
 RN-9893
 SET2
 ZINC17988990

References 

Pyrroles